Ichon may refer to:
 Ichon County, a county in Kangwon province, North Korea
 Ichon Chongnyon Station, the railway station for Ichon, North Korea
 Ichon-dong, a dong of Yongsan-gu, Seoul, South Korea
 Ichon Station, a transfer point on the Seoul Metro
 Ichon, a barangay in Macrohon, Southern Leyte, Philippines

See also 
 Icheon, a city in Gyeonggi province, South Korea